L'Albère is a commune in the Pyrénées-Orientales department in southern France.

Geography

Localisation 
L'Albère is located in the canton of Vallespir-Albères and in the arrondissement of Céret.

Toponymy 
The name of L'Albère is clearly issued from the Albera Massif in which it is located. Although always plural in French (Albères) concerning the mountain range, the name remains singular through the ages (L'Albère) for the commune. On the contrary, in Catalan, the name has always been singular for both the mountain (Serra de l'Albera) and the place (L'Albera).

History 
Early settlements of population grew near the two primitive churches : Saint Martin, already named in 844 (cella Sancti Martini de Monte Furcato) and Saint John, known since 1089 (ecclesiae Sancti Ioannis de Albera). The hamlets of Saint Martin and Saint John both still exist nowadays, each with its church.

Government and politics

Canton 
In 1790, the commune of L'Albère is included into the canton of Argelès, then part of the Céret district. It is moved to the canton of Laroque in 1793 and back to the canton of Argelès in 1801, before being finally included in the canton of Céret in 1947. Following the French canton reorganisation which came into effect in March 2015, L'Albère is now part of the canton of Vallespir-Albères.

Mayors

Population and society

Demography

Education 
There is no school in L'Albère. The nearest is in Le Perthus.

Events 
 Patronal feast : 5 August.
 Communal feast : 2nd Sunday of August.

Health 
There are no doctors in L'Albère. The nearest are in Le Perthus.

Sports 
L'Albère has several climbing sites.

Sites of interest 

 Balma de Na Cristiana : a large dolmen.
 Saint-John Church
 Saint-Martin Church
 Saint-Christopher chapel

See also

Communes of the Pyrénées-Orientales department

References

Communes of Pyrénées-Orientales